The Kurt Gödel Society was founded in Vienna, Austria in 1987. It is an international organization aimed at promoting research primarily on logic, philosophy and the history of mathematics, with special attention to connections with Kurt Gödel, in whose honour it was named.

The group also organizes an ongoing lecture series called Collegium Logicum. Former speakers include Henk Barendregt,  George Boolos,  Jaakko Hintikka and Wilfrid Hodges.

In April 2006, the Gödel society  organized Horizons of Truth, an international symposium celebrating the 100th Birthday of Kurt Gödel.  In 2011, the Gödel society with support from the Templeton Foundation awarded 5 "Kurt Gödel Centenary Research Prize Fellowships", with a total amount of US$680,000.  In 2008, the first round of these fellowships was awarded.   In 2015, SIGLOG, EATCS, EACSL and the Kurt Gödel Society established the "Alonzo Church Award for Outstanding Contributions to Logic and Computation"

Links and references 
 Kurt Gödel Society

References

International organisations based in Austria
Logic organizations
Mathematical societies
Organizations established in 1987
International learned societies
1987 establishments in Austria